Venoah Lake is a lake in Carlton County, Minnesota, in the United States.

Venoah is a construct of the nicknames of Winona and Marie, the daughters of a settler.

See also
List of lakes in Minnesota

References

Lakes of Minnesota
Lakes of Carlton County, Minnesota